Theobald I may refer to:

 Theobald I, King of Austrasia, ruled 548-555
 Theobald I, Count of Blois, ruled 928–975
 Theobald I, Count of Champagne ruled 1037–1089
 Theobald I, Duke of Lorraine (c. 1191 – 1220)
 Theobald I, King of Navarre ruled 1234–1253